GPF may refer to:

 Canon de 155mm GPF, a French heavy artillery gun
 *Gallons per flush*, a measure of flush toilet water efficiency
 General protection fault, a computer error on the Intel x86 architecture
 General Purpose Frigate (Canada)
 Global Peace Foundation
 Global Philanthropy Forum
 Global Policy Forum, an American international government accountability organization
 Gozarto Protection Force, a Syrian militia
 Grand Prix of Figure Skating Final
 Greater palatine foramen
 Grosse Pointe Farms
 Yaroslavl Global Policy Forum, an international forum